Jan-Peter Frahm (14 February 1945 – 5 February 2014) was a German botanist dedicated to the study of mosses.

Career
Frahm studied biology and geography at the University of Hamburg before switching to the University of Kiel for his undergraduate degree. He returned to Kiel and earned his Ph.D. in botany in 1972. He then worked at the University of Duisburg, where he  was appointed professor in 1981. Research stays at foreign institutes (eg. Helsinki, Paris, Stockholm, Chicago) and a visiting professorship at the University of Alberta in 1989 followed. He moved from Duisburg to the University of Bonn in 1994.

He was honored in 1995 with the Richard Spruce Award by the International Association of Bryologists for excellence in bryology. He was also awarded by the University of Helsinki. In recognition of his achievements, new species such as Sphagnum frahmii, Porotrichum frahmii, Cololejeunea frahmii, Pylaisiella frahmii and Porothamnium frahmii were named after him. The genus Frahmiella in the family Brachytheciaceae also bears his name. In 2014, he became the namesake of the bryological online journal Frahmia.

Frahm conducted research on numerous topics of bryology and published more than 650 publications. Within his moss research, he was concerned with bioindication. Frahm noted that the improved air quality in cities has led to an increased number of lichen species colonizing urban areas. He also demonstrated that the release of ammonia by auto-catalysts causes nitrogen-loving lichens and mosses and nitrogen-emitting plants to settle along roads.

Frahm was also passionate about cooking. He published his own cook book, 10000 Kochideen, in 2007.

Journalistic activity
Frahm was the publisher of the following journals:
 Archive For Bryology, an internet magazine
 Bryologische Rundbriefe, an electronic newsletter with information on moss research in Germany
 Limprichtia, a magazine for moss research in Germany
 Tropical Bryology, an international non-profit journal on the biology of tropical mosses; now under the title Bryophyte Diversity and Evolution

Selected publications

References

Bryologists
Botanists with author abbreviations
20th-century  German botanists
1945 births
2014 deaths
Scientists from Hamburg